Graham Jarvis (1930–2003) was a Canadian character actor.

Graham Jarvis may also refer to:
 Graham Jarvis (motorcyclist) (born 1975), British enduro and motorcycle trials rider
 Graham Jarvis (bowls), Canadian international lawn bowler